Krajina is a Slavic toponym, meaning 'frontier' or 'march'. The term is related to kraj or krai, originally meaning 'edge' and today denoting a region or province, usually remote from urban centers.

Etymology

In some South Slavic languages, including Serbo-Croatian and Slovene, the word krajina or its cognate still refers primarily to a border, fringe, or borderland of a country (sometimes with an established military defense), and secondarily to a region, area, or landscape. Krajina is also a surname, mostly among South Slavic language speakers. The word kraj can today mean an end or extremity, or region or area. Archaically extrapolated, it could mean 'army' or 'war'; this meaning developed from the earlier meaning of 'borderland' in a manner analogous to the French word . The term is equivalent to German Mark and French marche. In the Habsburg Empire, a large region in modern Croatia was referred to as the Military Frontier (Militärgrenze; Vojna krajina).

In other Slavic languages (including the Chakavian and Kajkavian dialects of Serbo-Croatian), the term has other meanings, either a territorial name (cf. Krajna in Poland, from Old Polish , meaning region, borderland, extremity) or a word meaning 'a land, landscape' (for example in Polish, Slovak, Czech or Sorbian). In Slovenian, the word means both 'landscape' and march.

The name of Ukraine has a similar linguistic origin.

Geographical regions

Bosnia and Herzegovina
 Bosanska Krajina, in a triangle roughly between Banja Luka, Prijedor and Bihać, and encompassing a larger area westwards from the Vrbas river to Una and toward the Sava on the north, while on the south it is bordered by the Unac. In medieval Bosnia the region was known as Donji Kraji.
 Cazinska Krajina, the borderland of Bosnia adjacent to Croatia around the city of Cazin. Today it constitutes Una-Sana Canton.

Bosnia-Herzegovina and Croatia
 Krajina, medieval name for the region(s) in Central Dalmatia in Croatia, including parts of Lower Neretva and western Herzegovina in today's Bosnia and Herzegovina. It extended in the east-west direction from the lower course of the river Neretva in the east to the river Cetina in the west, and in the south-north direction from the rivers Vrljika and Trebižat and the mountains Dinara, Mosor and Biokovo in the north to the Adriatic Sea.
 Neretvanska krajina, historical area west of the river Neretva and southwest of Imotski; including a part of the peri-littoral area near Makarska in Croatia is called Krajina;
 Omiška krajina, region in the hinterland of Omiš, in Zagora in southern Croatia, west of Cetinska krajina;
 Vrgoračka krajina, area in Zagora, in southern Croatia, around the city of Vrgorac, southwest of Herzegovina and west of the Neretva valley, east of Imotska krajina;
 Vrlička krajina, area in Zagora, in southern Croatia, around the city of Vrlika, west of Livanjski kraj, northwest of Cetinska krajina (sometimes considered as part of Cetinska krajina);
 Imotska krajina, area around the city of Imotski, in Zagora in southern Croatia, constituted mostly by Imotsko polje;
 Cetinska krajina, area along the valley of the river Cetina in southern Croatia, in Zagora, west of the border with Herzegovina, constituted mostly by Sinjsko polje.

Croatia
 Krayna vu Otoce, medieval Glagolitic name of the Gacka valley in the Lika highlands.
 municipality of Krajina, a former municipality located between Split and Imotski in southern Croatia, existed from 1912–1945;
 also the name of the soccer club from Imotski.
 Drniška krajina, area around the city of Drniš, in Zagora in southern Croatia.
 Istarska krajina, historical region in western Croatia, central area of Istria.
 Kninska Krajina, region around Knin in southern Croatia, north of Drniška krajina and northeast of Cetinska krajina.
 Sinjska krajina, area in Zagora in southern Croatia around the city of Sinj, west of Livanjski kraj, southeast of Vrlička krajina (sometimes considered as part of Cetinska krajina).

Montenegro
 Skadarska Krajina, region north of Bar and Ulcinj, across the mountain. It borders Skadar Lake on its northern edge.

Poland
 Krajna, historical region on the border between Greater Poland and Pomerania.
 Ukraine, historical region on the border between Poland and Russia

Serbia
 Timok Valley, border region of Serbia adjacent to Bulgaria, around the Timok River.
 Negotin Valley, a part of the Timok Valley around the city of Negotin.
 Koča's krajina, an area liberated during the eighth Austrian-Turkish war.

Slovenia
 White Carniola, borderland of Slovenia adjacent to Croatia.

Political regions

Subdivisions of Austria-Hungary:
 Military Frontier, borderland of Austrian Empire against the Ottoman Empire. It was further divided into:
 Banat Krajina (on the Serbian-Romanian border);
 Croatian Krajina (on the border of western Croatia and Bosnia);
 Slavonian Krajina (on the border of Serbia and eastern Croatia with Bosnia).

Political units formed by rebel Serbs at the beginning of the Croatian War of Independence (1991–95):
Republic of Serbian Krajina (1991–95)
SAO Krajina
SAO Kninska Krajina, used by some since the Yugoslav Wars to signify two regions, Knin and its surroundings, and to a larger extent Krajina proper (the main portion of the Republic of Serb Krajina).
SAO Eastern Slavonia, Baranja and Western Syrmia, sometimes called Podunavska Krajina

Political unit formed by Serbs in the prelude (1991) to the Bosnian War (1992–95):
SAO Bosanska Krajina

Where the term Serbian Krajina or Krajina alone is used, it most often refers to the former Republic of Serbian Krajina.

In Russia:
 In Russian, kray is the word for the territories of Russia, a second-level subdivision.

In Slovakia:
 In Slovak, kraj is used for the regions of Slovakia, a first-level subdivision.

In the Czech Republic:
 In Czech, kraj is used for the regions of the Czech Republic, a first-level subdivision.

In Ukraine:
 In Ukrainian, krajina means 'country, land', while Ukrajina is the country's name. See also: Name of Ukraine.

People
Krajina Belojević, a 9th-century Serbian duke in the Principality of Serbia

See also
Krain
Kraj
Ukraine
Semasiological map for *krajь

References 

Karlo Jurišić, Lepantska pobjeda i makarska Krajina, Adriatica maritima, sv. I, (Lepantska bitka, Udio hrvatskih pomoraca u Lepantskoj bitki 1571. godine), Institut JAZU u Zadru, Zadar, 1974., str. 217., 222., (reference from Morsko prase)

Slavic toponyms
Serbo-Croatian toponyms